Rose is a small unincorporated rural community and census-designated place in southeastern Mayes County, Oklahoma, United States, on Scenic U.S. Highway 412. The community was said to have been named for Rowe's Prairie, which is nearby. The post office was established March 13, 1891, with David Ragsdale as the postmaster. The ZIP Code is 74364.

Demographics

Saline District Courthouse

It was built in 1884 on a site covering .

The Cherokee Nation has designated this the first national park for the tribe. It ceased to function for its original purpose when the Curtis Act dissolved the tribal government before Oklahoma became a state in 1907. The building was sold to the highest bidder and became a private residence until 1970. The owner sold it to the state, which later resold it to the Cherokee Nation. Although the state had agreed to maintain the structure, it did not do so. In 2003, Preservation Oklahoma, Inc. listed the Saline District Courthouse as one of "...Oklahoma's most endangered historic properties." The Cherokee Nation began restoring the site, including the grounds and a spring house, in 2008. The main building had been covered with lead-based paint, so the restoration received a $104,000 EPA Brownfields grant, plus a supplemental grant of $45,000 to complete the remediation project.  In June 2011, the Oklahoma State Historical Society presented an award to the Nation for its efforts to restore the site.  The courthouse was undergoing renovation in 2019.

The courthouse, which actually lies in Delaware County, was added to the National Register of Historic Places (NRHP) with NRIS number 76001561.

External links

References

Populated places established in 1891
Pre-statehood history of Oklahoma
Census-designated places in Mayes County, Oklahoma
Census-designated places in Oklahoma
Unincorporated communities in Mayes County, Oklahoma
Unincorporated communities in Oklahoma
National Register of Historic Places in Delaware County, Oklahoma